Richard Misiano-Genovese (born 1947) is a collagist, photographer, painter, and theorist, and practitioner of transgressive art.

Misiano-Genovese is the surrealist initiator of the Altered Lithograph, Excavation Collage and Novel, plus Superimposition "chance" overprints.

Publications
"Surrealismo: El Oro del Tiempo" (June 2014) (Madrid, Spain)
"Arturo Schwarz Il Surrealismo Ieri e oggi" (Libro terzo su CD allegato) (July 2014) (Milano, Italy)
A Phala, "revista del movimiento surrealista" No. 2, (January 2013), No. 3 (April 2015) (São Paulo, Brazil) 
LOUP-GAROU, La Belle Inutile Editions (2010, 2012) (N.Y./Paris)
GRASP Magazin]#6 (April 2011)
 Punto Seguido Issue 51 (2008) (Medellin, Colombia)
"ME", an autobiography,Fiji Island Mermaid Press (2003)
"The Exhibitioner", (Vol. 2, Issue No. 3 – 1994), Publications Archives Museum of Modern Art, New York, N.Y.
"Appearances Magazine" (No. 14, 1988), New York, N.Y.
"Excavations" (La Belle Inutile Editions, 2008), Paris/N.Y.

"Dreamwhite" (La Belle Inutile Editions, 2010), Paris/N.Y.
 "Bloomsbury International Encyclopedia of Surrealism",(2020)

Special library collections

Twentieth-Century Materials, "The John Matthews Library of Surrealism" collection, Harry Ransom Center, University of Texas at Austin (ca. 1987)
"Guide to the Bob Witz Papers/Appearances Magazine", Fales Library and Special Collections, Elmer Holmes Bobst Library, NYU, New York, NY (ca. 1980–1996)
"The Register of Clayton Eshleman Papers", MSS 0021, Mandeville Special Collections Library, Geisel Library, University of California, San Diego; Accessions Processed in 1987 (1958–1993)

Museum collections

Ontological Museum of the International Post-Dogmatist Group (2010)
CES – Centro de Estudos do Surrealismo, Fundação Cupertino de Miranda (2013, 2016)
Fundación Camaleonart (2015)

Filmography

Visited (A Myk Saiten film), cameo appearance (2017)

Exhibitions
 Service Culturels de L'Ambassade de France (NY, NY) "Cinquantenaire de la Parution la Surrealisme" (1974)
 Surrealism in 2012: "Toward the World of the Fifth Sun" (2012)
 Surrealismo Internacional Exposición (San José, Costa Rica) "Las Llaves Del Deseo" (2016)

See also
Surrealist techniques
Pierre Molinier

References

1947 births
Living people
20th-century painters
Collage artists